Yarrow Maaytey was a Somali ruler, and the founder of the Galluweger Dynasty.

Biography
Sometime in the 17th century, about 12,000 members of the Galluweger tribe, under the leadership of Yaroow Maaytey, fought against the armies of the Ajuran Dynasty. Yaroow Maaytey becomes the first Galluweger Dynasty to rule outside the Bakool region. His son Amir Geedow would later succeed him. Although both his reign and empire were short-lived, the cultural impact of his conquests lasted for centuries. He had brought most of the city-state concept in Somalia and united all Maay speaking people Digil & Marifle using both military and diplomatic means. Shiek Yarow Maaytey repeatedly defeated the Ajuran army in battle; marched through what is now known Bakool, Bay, and Afgooye where he defeated the Silcis Dynasty, Bardheere (Geedo region) in the process he overthrew the Ajuuraan king and conquered half the entirety of the Ajuran Empire.

17th-century Somalian people
Ethnic Somali people
Somali sultans
Ajuran Sultanate